Douglas Corney Breton (25 November 1883 – 11 February 1955) was a soldier and a provincial politician from Alberta, Canada. He served as a member of the Legislative Assembly of Alberta from 1926 to 1930 sitting with United Farmers caucus in government.

Early life
Douglas Corney Breton was born 25 November 1883 at Simon's Town, Cape Colony to William Edwards Breton (18521914) an Inspector General of the Royal British Navy, and Alice Maud Breton (ńee Dudoit) the daughter of Jules Dudoit French Consul to the Hawaiian Islands. Breton moved to Canada at the age of 20 in 1904. On 24 January 1920, Breton married Dorothy Blanche Frost, the daughter of Mark Edwin Prescott Frost , together they had three children.

He served in World War I as a member of the British Expeditionary Force in Afghanistan and India.

Political career
Breton ran for a seat in the 1926 Alberta general election as a United Farmers candidate in the electoral district of Leduc. He won a hotly contested three-way race in the second vote count to pick up the open seat for his party.

A year after being elected to office the town of Keystone, Alberta was changed to Breton, Alberta in 1927 in his honor.

Breton ran for a second term in office in the 1930 Alberta general election. He was defeated in a close two-way race losing by just 60 votes to Liberal candidate Arthur Mitchell.

Later life
Breton moved to England in 1934, and died in Winchester on 11 February 1953 at the age of 69.

References

External links

Legislative Assembly of Alberta Members Listing

United Farmers of Alberta MLAs
British Army personnel of World War I
Royal Hampshire Regiment officers
People from Simon's Town
1883 births
1953 deaths
Emigrants from Cape Colony to Canada